The Midnight Beast is a British sitcom that was released by the UK comedy band The Midnight Beast in 2012. The show had been in production for almost a year before release and featured most of the songs from the band's debut album. It was announced on The Midnight Beast's YouTube channel that the show has been renewed for a second and final series.

Story
The show follows the lives of the band as they try to become better musicians. They live in a rubbish flat and are almost broke. Their creepy neighbour Sloman (played by Simon Farnaby) is often trying to impress them or join them in various events. The band has not achieved anything yet; they are broke and starving. Their manager, Chevy (played by Ryan Pope) is not much help, as he is a drug addict and only interested in them to make money for drugs. Stefan's girlfriend Zoe (played by Sophie Wu) also appears in all six episodes. They come across various problems, such as an eccentric artist making a disgusting music video of them, Dru spending too much time playing games and selling themselves to a bad and controlling record label.

The second season follows the boys as they finally get a proper job as cleaners at a run-down ex-Bingo Hall. They are asked to do additional task by employer Sylvia (Julia Deakin) to ensure they keep their jobs as they continually make mistakes and anger customers. They also enter competitions regularly in an effort to improve their financial state. The band also temporarily splits, as Ash leaves to pursue a solo career, but re-joins the band following his rise to success, only to be discovered as a fraud as he "doesn't actually release any music". Their past and the creation of the band is also revealed during a flashback when returning to their old school together. The final episode of the season involves the band entering in a pub quiz to try and win enough money to pay off their employer's gambling debt. It is revealed that all the entrants are cheating, and it is up to them to avoid being caught by quiz-master Sloman to cheat their way to victory.

Release
The show was first aired in the UK on the channel E4 in 2012. One episode was released each week over a six-week period. After each episode, you could buy the soundtrack in the form of a Single on iTunes. The lead up to the first episode featured a live performance by the band, and a tweet of #UnleashTheBeast going up on Twitter and a Live Q&A on YouTube. The first episode of the show was premiered in Australia on the channel SBS2 on 22 April 2013. The DVD of the first season is for sale (in Region 2 format) on Amazon.

Main cast

Episodes

References

External links
 
 

2012 British television series debuts
2014 British television series endings
2010s British sitcoms
E4 sitcoms
English-language television shows
Television shows set in London